Farrington may refer to:

Geography

Places in the United Kingdom 
 Farrington, Dorset, England, a settlement in Iwerne Courtney civil parish
 Farrington Gurney, Somerset, England

Places in the United States 
 Farrington, Illinois, in Clark County
 Farrington, North Carolina
 Farrington Township, Jefferson County, Illinois
 Farrington, Washington

Others 
 Farrington House, historic house in Concord, New Hampshire
 Farrington House, Alderley, a heritage-listed house in Brisbane, Queensland, Australia
 Farrington Highway, Oahu, Hawaii
 Farrington Island, Antarctica
 Farrington Lake, Middlesex County, New Jersey
 Farrington Ridge, Antarctica
 The Farrington, Anguilla
 Farrington High School, Honolulu, Hawaii, named for Wallace Rider Farrington

Other uses
 Farrington (name), a given name and surname
 Farrington Aircraft, defunct American manufacturer of autogyros
 Farrington baronets, a title in the Baronetage of the United Kingdom
 Farrington Field, stadium in Fort Worth, Texas
 Farrington of the F.O., British television comedy series
 Farrington v. Tokushige (1927), a U.S. Supreme Court case
 Farrington's Regiment or the 29th (Worcestershire) Regiment of Foot, infantry regiment of the British Army

See also
 Faringdon, Oxfordshire, England
 Farrington Paddock, Motor Racing
 Farington (disambiguation)
 Farringdon (disambiguation)